Ivan Mitford-Barberton (1896–1976) was a sculptor, writer and authority on heraldry.

Early life and education 

Mitford-Barberton was born in Somerset East, in Cape Colony, in 1896. He was a descendant of several 1820 Settler families. His grandmother was the naturalist, Mary Elizabeth Barber. He did his schooling at St. Andrew's College, Grahamstown.  In 1912 his family moved to Kenya, where he encountered African and Arab subjects that later formed an important theme in his work.  From 1915 to 1918 he served as a soldier in East Africa.  From 1919 to 1922 he studied at the Grahamstown School of Art, and from 1923 at the Royal College of Art in London, under Henry Moore and Derwent Wood. He returned to Kenya in 1927 and set up a studio there. Mitford-Barberton was an active member of the South African Society of Arts and taught art at the Michaelis School of Fine Art in Cape Town.

Works 

He designed the monument of Jock of the Bushveld in Barberton, a place that was co-founded by his ancestors. The bronze statue of a leopard in Hout Bay, where he lived, is his work. The sculpture of Peter Pan at the Red Cross Children's Hospital in Cape Town was done by Mitford-Barberton

In the 1930s he designed parts of the exterior and the interior decoration of Mutual Building, in Cape Town, the then highest building in Africa  (excluding the Pyramids of Giza).  The exterior is equipped with a  granite frieze and with nine  figures.

Mitford-Barberton designed the stucco reliefs that were placed in the pediments of the neo-baroque public buildings of Tongaat and Maidstone in Kwa-Zulu Natal.  These reliefs were an emulation of the eighteenth-century work in the Cape of the noted sculptor Anton Anreith and his colleague, the architect Louis Thibault. Where Anreith and Thibault modelled Palladian figures drawn from classical mythology, Mitford-Barberton designed groupings of plantation workers, and allusions to the Saunders family, founders of the Tongaat Sugar Company. Mitford-Barberton also undertook freestanding sculptures for public spaces and garden features on the Tongaat estate.

Miford-Barberton created the sculpture of the Settler family at the 1820 Settlers National Monument in Grahamstown. 

From 1947 to 1961, Mitford-Barberton was a member of the Royal Society of British Sculptors, 1957-1961 a Fellow of the Society and a member of the Theosophical Lodge Cape Town.

Mitford-Barberton was a prominent figure in the field of heraldry.  In 1947, the Cape Provincial Administration commissioned him to prepare a display of municipal coats of arms for the visit of King George VI.  Shortly afterwards, the administration asked municipalities to have their arms checked, and if necessary, re-designed, by Mitford-Barberton, to improve heraldic quality.  As a result, he designed dozens of municipal coats of arms, some of them in collaboration with H. Ellis Tomlinson (in England).  In 1956, he addressed the Institute of Town Clerks of Southern Africa on the subject.

He was a founder member of the Heraldry Society of Southern Africa in 1953.  He was a member of the Heraldry Council from 1963 to 1972.

Ivan Mitford-Barberton wrote several books on the history of his family and the 1820 Settlers.  He was married twice and had five children, three sons and two daughters.

Publications 

 
  with Violet White

Notes and references

Further reading

External links 
 
 Ivan Graham MITFORD-BARBERTON 

1896 births
1976 deaths
20th-century sculptors
Alumni of St. Andrew's College, Grahamstown
Cape Colony people
Ivan
People from Somerset East
South African heraldists
South African people of British descent
South African sculptors
Academic staff of the University of Cape Town
White South African people